This is a list of flags used in Sri Lanka.

National flag

Presidential flag (1972–2022)

This flag was personal to every President of Sri Lanka, and as such the design changes when a new president assumes office.

On 15 July 2022, the acting President Ranil Wickremesinghe abolished the presidential flag.

Civil ensigns

Military flags

Government flags

Provincial flags

Historical flags

Sinhala Kingdom flags

Tamil Occupation flags

Portuguese Ceylon flags

Dutch Ceylon flags

British Ceylon flags

Ensigns

Royal standards

Viceregal flags

Military flags

References

Sri Lanka

Flags